Robert Hugh Porter (born 1955) is an American economist and William R. Kenan, Jr. Professor of economics at Northwestern University. His research focuses on industrial organisation and auctions.

Education 
Porter received his undergraduate degree from the University of Western Ontario's Department of Mathematics and Economics in 1976. He went on to further study at Princeton University, which granted him a Ph. D. in economics in 1981.

Career 
Upon graduating from Princeton University, Porter worked as an assistant professor at the University of Minnesota, followed by a brief stint as an associate professor at Stony Brook University. He became professor at Northwestern University in 1987 and was department chair from 2004 to 2007.

Porter was elected fellow of the Econometric Society in 1989 and served as its president in 2015. The American Academy of Arts and Sciences made him fellow in 1997. He is a fellow of the Game Theory Society.

He has served as editor and coeditor of various economic journals, such as The RAND Journal of Economics, Econometrica and The Review of Economic Studies.

References

External links 
 Official website
 Profile on the website of Northwestern university

1955 births
American economists
University of Western Ontario alumni
Princeton University alumni
Northwestern University faculty
Living people
Fellows of the Econometric Society
Fellows of the American Academy of Arts and Sciences